Stanisław Oślizło (born 13 November 1937 in Wodzisław Śląski) is a retired Polish footballer (defender). Oślizło began playing  football in 1953 with the locals clubs Odra Wodzisław and later Górnik Radlin. He was most of the time connected with Górnik Zabrze in the greatest era of this club.  He played for Poland 57 times scoring one goal (1961–1971).  He was a captain of Górnik Zabrze in the Cup Winners Cup final in 1970 versus Manchester City.

References

External links

Article about Oslizlo in the Austrian football magazine "ballesterer"

1937 births
Living people
Polish footballers
Poland international footballers
Odra Wodzisław Śląski players
Górnik Zabrze players
People from Wodzisław Śląski
Polish football managers
Górnik Zabrze managers
Odra Wodzisław Śląski managers
Piast Gliwice managers
GKS Katowice managers
Sportspeople from Silesian Voivodeship
Association football defenders